An unofficial referendum on integration into Sweden was held in Åland in June 1919. The referendum was organised by the Lagting and approved by a vote on 1 June. It took the form of a petition in which voters could sign in  yes or no columns. Although the proposal was approved by 95.48% of voters, the islands remained under Finnish control following a decision by the League of Nations in 1921.

Results

References

1919 referendums
1919 in Finland
Referendums in Åland
History of Åland
June 1919 events
Border polls
Aftermath of World War I in Finland
Sovereignty referendums
National unifications
Swedish nationalism